The Landmarks and Monuments of Florida State University are monuments and landmarks located on Florida State University's Tallahassee campus that are considered culturally or historically significant. The landmarks usually depict a person in the history of the university or represent an ideal that the university holds. These landmarks can also represent a key part of traditions held by the student body.

Landmarks and Monuments at Florida State

See also
 History of Florida State University
 Florida State Seminoles

References

External links
 Florida State University's Legacy Walk website

Florida State University